Abdul Salam Mumini is a Ghanaian film maker.

Career
His first film was God Loves Prostitutes, which starred Nollywood star Genevieve Nnaji. Salam's Venus Film Production is responsible for the discovery of the likes of Van Vicker, Jackie Aygemang, Nadia Buari and a host of emerging others.

Credits
 Return of Beyonce
 Beyonce
 Mummy's Daughter
 Wedlock of the Gods
 Darkness of Sorrow
 My mothers Heart
 Divine Love
 Heart of Men
 The Game
 Foreplay

References

External links
 

Ghanaian film producers
Ghanaian screenwriters
Living people
Year of birth missing (living people)